Selkirk Farm, also known as the Reverend James A. Cousar House, is a historic home located near Bingham, Dillon County, South Carolina. It was built in 1858, with  additions made between 1880 and 1910, and is a one-story, clapboard Greek Revival style cottage of heart pine. The front façade features a pedimented porch with four square columns. The house rests on brick foundation pillars. The property also includes an antebellum cotton gin and a well.

It was listed on the National Register of Historic Places in 1974.

References

Houses on the National Register of Historic Places in South Carolina
Greek Revival houses in South Carolina
Houses completed in 1858
Houses in Dillon County, South Carolina
National Register of Historic Places in Dillon County, South Carolina